Vitezović is a surname. Notable people with the surname include:

 Pavao Ritter Vitezović (1652–1713), Croatian writer
 Milovan Vitezović (1944–2022), Serbian writer